Angel and demon customers is a marketing concept dividing customers into two groups. Angel customers are profitable, whereas demon customers may actually cost a company more to serve than it makes from them. 
Demon customers attempt to extract as much value as possible out of the seller.  Examples of demon customer buying behaviour:
 Buying discounted merchandise designed to boost store traffic, then resell the goods at a profit on eBay. 
 Buying a product, apply for rebates, return the purchases, then buy them back at returned merchandise discounts.

References

External links
Digital Marketing Strategies

Customer relationship management